Senator Manning may refer to:

Gayle Manning (born 1950), Ohio State Senate
George T. Manning (1908–1956), New York State Senate
James Manning Jr. (fl. 2010s), Oregon State Senate
John Lawrence Manning (1816–1889), South Carolina State Senate
Randolph Manning (1804–1864), Michigan State Senate
Richard Irvine Manning I (1789–1836), South Carolina State Senate